Visa requirements for Malawian citizens are administrative entry restrictions by the authorities of other states placed on citizens of the Malawi. As of 2 July 2019, Malawian citizens had visa-free or visa on arrival access to 70 countries and territories, ranking the Malawian passport 73rd in terms of travel freedom according to the Henley Passport Index.

Visa requirements map

Visa requirements

Dependent, Disputed, or Restricted territories
Unrecognized or partially recognized countries

Dependent and autonomous territories

See also

Visa policy of Malawi
Malawian passport

References and Notes
References

Notes

Malawi
Foreign relations of Malawi